is a Japanese football manager of Cambodia national under-20 football team. He was the manager of the Bhutan national football team from 2012 to 2014.

References

1972 births
Living people
Japanese football managers
Japanese expatriates in Bhutan
Expatriate football managers in Bhutan
Bhutan national football team managers
Japanese expatriate football managers